Lancs/Cheshire Division 1 (usually referred to as Lancs/Cheshire 1) was a regional English Rugby Union league for teams from Cheshire, Merseyside, Lancashire and Greater Manchester, ranked at tier 8 of the English league system. The top two clubs are promoted to North 2 West and the bottom two clubs are relegated to Lancs/Cheshire 2.  Each season two teams from Lancs/Cheshire 1 are picked to take part in the RFU Senior Vase (a national competition for clubs at level 8) - one affiliated with the Cheshire RFU, the other with the Lancashire RFU.

The division was initially known as North-West West 1 when it was created in 1987, and had a number of different names since with South Lancs/Cheshire 1 being the longest running.  The division switched to its current name for the 2018–19 season due to the restructuring of the northern leagues by the RFU as a result of 19 Lancashire clubs withdrawing from RFU competitions across the leagues to form their own competitions.  This would see the North Lancashire/Cumbria division abolished, with Lancashire-based sides from that league being transferred into Lancs/Cheshire 1, while the Cumbria sides were transferred into Cumbria 1.

The introduction of North 2 West for the 2019–20 season at tier 7 of the north west leagues, meant that Lancs/Cheshire Division 1 dropped down to being a tier 8 league.

The after the cancellation of Adult Competitive Leagues (National League 1 and below) for the 2020/21 season that due to the coronavirus pandemic the league was disbanded with teams transferred into the Lancashire Merit Table competitions or ADM Lancashire leagues.

Teams 2019–20

Teams 2018–19

Teams 2017–18

Participating Clubs 2016-17
Anselmians
Bowdon
Broughton Park
Douglas (I.O.M.)
Glossop
Liverpool St Helens
Manchester
Manchester Medics (promoted from Cheshire (South))
New Brighton
Oswestry (promoted from Cheshire (South))
Sefton
Southport (promoted from Merseyside (West))
Widnes
Wigan

Participating Clubs 2015-16

Participating Clubs 2014-15
Altrincham Kersal (relegated from North 1 West)
Anselmians
Bowdon (promoted from South Lancs/Cheshire 2)
Douglas (I.O.M.)
Glossop	
Hoylake	
Liverpool St Helens (relegated from North 1 West)
Manchester
Manchester Medics (promoted from South Lancs/Cheshire 2)
Northwich
Ruskin Park
Sefton	
West Park St Helens
Winnington Park

Participating Clubs 2013-14
Anselmians	
Ashton-on-Mersey
Douglas (I.O.M.) (promoted from South Lancs/Cheshire 2)
Glossop
Hoylake
Manchester (relegated from North 1 West)
New Brighton
Northwich
Ruskin Park
Sefton (promoted from South Lancs/Cheshire 2)
Tyldesley
West Park St Helens
Wigan
Winnington Park

Participating Clubs 2012-13
Ashton-on-Mersey
Bowdon
Broughton Park  (relegated from North 1 West)
Crewe & Nantwich
Glossop	
Hoylake
New Brighton
Orrell
Ruskin Park
Tyldesley
Warrington	
West Park St Helens
Wigan
Winnington Park

Original teams
When league rugby began in 1987 this division contained the following teams:

Aspull 
Birchfield
Douglas
Eagle
Liverpool College
Mersey Police
Old Anselmians
Old Parkonians
Oldershaw 
Ormskirk
St. Edward's Old Boys

Lancs/Cheshire 1 honours

North-West West 1 (1987–1992)

The original incarnation of Lancs/Cheshire 1 was known as North-West West 1, and was a tier 9 league with promotion up to North West 2 and relegation down to North-West West 2.

Cheshire/Lancs South (1992–1996)

Restructuring of north-west leagues saw North-West West 1 renamed as Cheshire/Lancs South for the 1993–94 season.  Promotion continued to be up to North West 2, while relegation was to either Cheshire or Lancashire South (new regional divisions of what was North-West West 2).  The division was initially at tier 9 but the creation of National 5 North for the 1993–94 season meant that Cheshire/Lancs South dropped to become a tier 10 league.

South Lancs/Cheshire 1 (1996–2000)

The league system was restructured from top to bottom by the Rugby Football Union for the start of the 1996–97 season.  Firstly, as part of the reorganisation of the Cheshire and Lancashire leagues, Cheshire/Lancs South was renamed South Lancs/Cheshire 1.  The cancellation of National 5 North and creation of North West 3 meant that South/Lancs Cheshire 1 remained a tier 10 league, with promotion to North West 3 and relegation to the newly named South/Lancs Cheshire 2 - now back to being a single division.  From the 1998–99 season onward the league was known as EuroManx South Lancs/Cheshire 1 after its sponsor EuroManx.

South Lancs/Cheshire 1 (2000–2018)

Northern league restructuring by the RFU at the end of the 1999–2000 season saw the cancellation of North West 1, North West 2 and North West 3 (tiers 7-9).  This meant that South/Lancs Cheshire 1 became a tier 7 league, with promotion to North 2 West (currently North 1 West).  The division would continue to be known as EuroManx South Lancs/Cheshire 1 until the 2007–08 season when EuroManx ceased operations.  Relegation during this time continued to be to South Lancs/Cheshire 2 except for one season (2015–16) where teams dropped to Cheshire (South), Lancashire (North) or Merseyside (West).

Lancs/Cheshire 1 (2018-present)

South Lancs/Cheshire 1 was renamed as Lancs/Cheshire 1 for the 2018–19 season continuing as a tier 7 league with promotion to North 1 West.  The creation of North 2 West for the 2019–20 season meant that Lancs/Cheshire 1 dropped to being a tier 8 league with promotion into this new division.  Relegation continued to Lancs/Cheshire 2 (formerly South Lancs/Cheshire 2).

Promotion play-offs

For the 2018–19 season there was play-off between the runners-up of Lancashire/Cheshire 1 and Cumbria 1 and for the third and final promotion place to North 1 West.  Previously Lancs/Cheshire sides had faced teams from North Lancashire/Cumbria (see following subsection).  As of 2019–20 Lancashire/Cheshire 1 sides have one win to Cumbria's zero; and the home side has one win to the away side's zero.  The introduction of North 2 West for the 2019–20 and the subsequent demotion of both Lancashire/Cheshire 1 and Cumbria 1 to tier 8 divisions, means that if the playoff continues it will be in place in the newly introduced division.

Discontinued promotion play-offs

Between the 2000–01 and 2017–18 seasons there was a play-off between the runners-up of North Lancashire/Cumbria and South Lancs/Cheshire 1 for the third and final promotion place to North 1 West. The team with the superior league record had home advantage in the tie.  This continued until the North Lancashire/Cumbria division was abolished due to RFU restructuring of the leagues.  At the end of the 2017–18 season the North Lancashire/Cumbria and South Lancs/Cheshire 1 team sides had nine wins apiece; and the home team had won promotion on thirteen occasions compared to the away teams five.

Number of league titles

Altrincham Kersal (3)
Warrington (3)
Broughton Park (2)
Northwich (2)
Ruskin Park (2)
St. Edward's Old Boys (2)
Wilmslow (2)
Anselmians (1)
Aspull (1)
Birchfield (1)
Birkenhead Park (1)
Burnage (1)
Caldy (1)
Leigh (1)
Manchester (1)
Mersey Police (1)
New Brighton (1)
Ormskirk (1)
Orrell (1)
Rochdale (1)
Sale FC (1)
South Liverpool (1)
Widnes (1)
Wirral (1)

See also
 Cheshire RFU
 Lancashire RFU
 English rugby union system
 Rugby union in England

Notes

References

8
Rugby union in Lancashire
Rugby union in Cheshire